Böcekli is a belde (town) in Düziçi district of Osmaniye Province, Turkey. At  the distance to Düziçi, is  .The population of the town is 2458 as of 2011. Two hundred years ago the original population of Böcekli under the leadership of certain Böcük Koca migrated from Şanlıurfa to present location. With the additional population from the  then nomadic Afşar tribes (a Turkmen tribe) they formed neighbouring villages. In 1994 Boyalı and other five villages merged to form the town of Böcekli. Böcekli, economy depends on irrigated farming. Peanut and cotton are among the main crops.

References

Populated places in Osmaniye Province
Towns in Turkey
Düziçi District